Luxembourg competed at the 1936 Summer Olympics in Berlin, Germany.  The nation returned to the Summer Games after having missed the 1932 Summer Olympics. 49 competitors, 48 men and 1 woman, took part in 35 events in 10 sports.

Athletics

Boxing

Canoeing

Cycling

Four cyclists, all men, represented Luxembourg  in 1936.

Individual road race
 Jacques Majerus
 Franz Neuens
 Paul Frantz
 Rudy Houtsch

Team road race
 Jacques Majerus
 Franz Neuens
 Paul Frantz
 Rudy Houtsch

Football

Gymnastics

Swimming

Weightlifting

Wrestling

Art competitions

References

External links
Official Olympic Reports

Nations at the 1936 Summer Olympics
1936
1936 in Luxembourgian sport